Mi Kola (also Romanized as Mī Kolā) is a village in Balatajan Rural District, in the Central District of Qaem Shahr County, Mazandaran Province, Iran. At the 2006 census, its population was 628, in 159 families.

References 

Populated places in Qaem Shahr County